Stadionul Sepsi Arena is a football stadium in Sfântu Gheorghe, Romania. It was opened in October 2021 and primarily serves as the new home stadium of Sepsi OSK Sfântu Gheorghe. 

Sepsi played its home matches on Municipal Stadium until the new stadium opened. 

The new stadium costed €25 million and seat 8,400 spectators. Construction works began in the summer of 2019, with the date of the opening being October 2021 with a match between Sepsi OSK and FC Voluntari played on 16 October. The building is located next to the Sepsi Arena.

History
The Hungarian government financed the construction of the stadium, after the Romanian government had previously built the Sepsi Arena in the same sports complex of Sfântu Gheorghe and several hockey rinks, in the Székelyföld, through the Compania Națională de Investiții.

See also 
List of football stadiums in Romania
List of European stadia by capacity

References
   

 
Sepsi OSK Sfântu Gheorghe
Football venues in Romania  
Buildings and structures in Covasna County 
Sports venues in Romania
21st century in Romania